Gaibandha (Gaibandha Jela or Gaibandha Zila) is a district in Northern Bangladesh. It is a part of the Rangpur Division. Gaibandha subdivision was established in 1875. Gaibandha was previously known as Bhabanigonj. The name was changed from Bhabanigonj to Gaibandha in 1875. Gaibandha was established as a district on 15 February 1984. Gaibandha is the administrative headquarter and largest urban centre of this district.

Etymology 
There are two opinions about the name of Gaibandha. The most famous opinion is: around five thousand years ago, capital of Matsya Kingdom of King Birat was in Gobindaganj area. Bengali: মৎস্য (Matsya) means fish and Bengali: দেশ (desh) means country. Fishes were abundant in his kingdom so the term Bengali: মৎস্য দেশ (Matsya Desh) was created. According to Mahabharata, king Birat had 60,000 cows which were frequently robbed by robbers. To protect his cattle from robbers, king Birat established a huge cattle-shed. The cattle were tied up alongside the rivers of this area. গাই (Gai) means "cow" and Bengali: বান্ধা (Bandha) means "to tie up". From this reason the area was called Gaibandha.

History 
In ancient times, this area was under water which was filled by the silt of Teesta, Brahmaputra and Jamuna river over time. This statement can be found in the description of famous Chinese traveler Xuanzang and astronomical books of Ptolemy. The flood of 1787 and the earthquake of 1898 made a major change in the landscape of this area which changed the flow of Teesta river, filled up a vast 15 miles area between Ghoraghat Upazila of Dinajpur and Tulshighat of Gaibandha and created small rivers like Kartoa, Ghaghot and Katakhali.

During the regime of British Empire, Governor Warren Hastings established 24 thanas under Rangpur district collectorate in 1793. According to the 1873 report of E.G Glazier, collector of Rangpur, three of the thanas was established in today's Gaibandha. Two of them, Gobindogonj and Sadullapur were established in Idrakpur pargana and the other named as Bhabaniganj was established in the Patildaho pargana.

During the Indian Rebellion of 1857, it was very difficult to stop the activities of the rebels from Rangpur. So Bhabaniganj thana was established in the bank of Bramhaputra river for administrative reason. On 27 May 1858, Bhabaniganj was established as a mahakuma. At first there were only two thanas: Sadullapur and Bhabaniganj. Gobindonganj was included in Bogra district 13 April 1821 but later on 12 August 1871, it was included in Bhabaniganj. Saghata, Phulchari, Palasbari and at last in 1870 Sundarganj was included in Bhabaniganj.

In 1872, river corrosion started in the eastside of Bramhaputra river. As a result, the mahakuma was moved from its original place and re-established in Gaibandha which was 12 km away from Bhabaniganj mahakuma. The sadar area was under control of three landlords. The Patiladaho paragana was under control of Tagore family who was said to be related to the Rabindranath Tagore family, the Baharbondo pargana was under landlord Manindro Nandi, ruled by Krishnanath's wife Maharani Swarnamoyee of Kasim Bazar and the Muktipur pargana was under control of landlord Lahiri family of Thanshinghopur. There was a collision between the landlords regarding the establishment of the mahakuma. At last by the initiatives of government officials, the administrative building and the court were established in Baharbondo pargana which was donated by queen Swarnamoyee. When the Bhabaniganj mouza was beginning to destroy by river erosion, the name of this mahakuma was changed from Bhabanigonj to Gaibandha. In the 80's when the mahakumas were changed to districts, Gaibandha mahakuma was also established as a district.

Geography
It has boundaries with the Kurigram and Rangpur to the north, Bogra District to the south, Joypurhat District, Dinajpur and Rangpur districts to the west, and Jamalpur and Kurigram districts, and the Jamuna River to the east. Gaibandha has seven upazilas and 82 unions. Jamuna, Teesta, Kartoa and Ghaghot are notable rivers in this district. There are total five rivers in Gaibandha. The total length of the rivers is 107.71 km. Bramhaputra, Teesta and Ghaghot are the main rivers. In the report Francis Buchanan-Hamilton in 1808–09, there were some forests in this area but there is no more any forest in today's Gaibandha. 20% of the district has clay soil which can be found in the Khiar area of Gobindaganj upazila, the rest of the land has sandy and peat and loam soil. The climate of this area is extremely intriguing and rainfall is high. No mineral resources has been found yet in this district.

Demographics

According to the 2022 Bangladesh census, Gaibandha District had a population of 2,562,232 of which 1,238,621 were males, 1,317,944 were females and 195 were third genders. Rural population was 2,160,862 (84.5%) while the urban population was 395,898 (15.5%). Gaibandha district had a literacy rate of 66.87% for the population 7 years and above: 70.2% for males and 63.8% for females.

Muslims make up 92.7% of the population, while Hindus are 7.0%, Christians 0.12% and 0.12% others. Bengalis make up the 99.75% of the total population. 4149 (0.25%) minorities live in this district of which 2043 are males and 2106 are females.

Language 
Most people of Gaibandha speak Bengali dialects of Rangpur region, Rangpuriya. People living in the southern portion (Shaghata and Gobindaganj) have a Bogra accent. The inhabitants of the chars in the Jamuna speak dialects of the Mymensingh region.

Economy

The main occupations of the people of Gaibandha district are agriculture 44.45%, agricultural laborer 27.72%, wage laborer 2.58%, transport 1.89%, commerce 9.11%, service 4.49% and others 9.76%. There are 2123 small industries, 5 medium industries and 1 large industry in Gaibandha. There are 4046 poultries, 10730 dairies, 245 fisheries, 18 hatcheries, 16 plant nurseries and 8 artificial cattle breeding centers. Total amount of  lands are 217040 hectare, arable land 160,397 hectares, irritable land are 139640 hectares, fallow land are 56643 hectares and total water reservoir are 5050.30 hectares; the amount of crop: single crop 20.5%, double crop 58.5% and treble crop 21%; land under irrigation 27.16%. Main crops are paddy, wheat, jute, sugarcane, potato, brinjal, mustard seed, chili, onion, garlic and vegetables. Jute is mainly produced in Gobindoganj, Palashbari and the northern side of this district. The production of aush rice and tobacco has decreased a lot in recent years but production of banana has increased significantly in Gobindoganj and Palashbari.

Notable places 

 Rajbirat Prasad, a palace, built in (743-800 A.D) by Samtat Deb.
 Naldanga Zamidar Bari, a palace.
 Bamondanga Zamidar Bari, a palace, built in 1252 A.D.
 Bardhan Kuthi, built in 16th century by Rampal.
 Shah Sultan Gazi's Mosque, a mosque, built in 1308 A.D by Saiyed Wajed Ali.

Notable people
 Shah Abdul Hamid, First Speaker of Bangladesh Jatiya Shangshad.
 Ahmed Hossain, Chairman Rangpur District Board, Minister for Agriculture, Forest & Fisheries.
 Abu Hussain Sarkar, Chief Minister of East Pakistan in 1955, Health Minister of combined Pakistan in 1956.

Administration
Gaibandha District is divided into 7 upazilas, which are further divided into 82 union parishads. The upazilas of the district are:

Included in these upazilas are 4 municipalities, which have a total of 18 wards and 56 mahallas. The municipalities are Gaibandha city, Gobindaganj and Sundarganj.

Infrastructure

Health 
There is a general hospital and six government hospitals, 46 non-government hospitals/clinics, 54 family welfare centers, 6 upazila health complex, 3 maternity and childcare center and 1 tuberculosis clinic in Gaibandha. 89% of total population get the facility of sanitation. The only government general hospital of the district is Gaibandha Sadar Hospital which is located at the Gaibandha Sadar.

Transport 
Total length of concrete road is 1719 km, dirt road is 2638 km, and the railway is 56 km. There are 14 railway stations, 1 bus station and 7 helipads in this district. There are 5890 bridges and culverts in this district. Length of national highway is 32.8 km, regional highway is 42.37 km and district highway is 208.95 km. There is no airport in this district.

In 1875, a company named Bengal State Railway established first railway in this area. The railway stations of Gaibandha are Bamandanga, Naldanga, Kamarpara, Kuptala, Gaibandha, Teermohoni, Balashighat railway ferry station, Badiakhali, Bonarpara junction, Mahimaganj, Bharatkhali, Phulchari and Teestamukh Ghat railway station. Kartoa express, Dolonchapa express, Lalmoni express and Rangpur express are the inter-city trains and Uttarbanga mail, Bogra express, Padmarag express and Ramsagar express are mail trains.

Major inter-division bus travels are Alhamra travels, Hanif travels, Shyamoly travels, Orin travels, S.R. travels etc. There are many inter-district bus travels available in this district which offers regular travel in Bogra and Rangpur district.

Transportation by river is not very popular in this district. There are a limited number of boats available in the Ghaghot river which offers a short travel.

Education

Education rate of Gaibandha is 67%. Among educational institutions, there are 8 government colleges, 48 non-government colleges, 9 government high schools, 361 non-government high schools, 44 junior high schools, 466 madrasas, 1466 government primary schools, 196 kindergartens, 1 primary teachers' training institute, and 1 agriculture training institute, 1 institute of livestock science & technology. Well-known educational institutions of Gaibandha District are:

University/college
Gaibandha Government College
Gaibandha Government Women's College
Ahammad Uddin Shah Shishu Niketan School & College
 Agricultural Training Institute
 Animal Research Institute
 Palashbari Govt. College
Secondary schools
Gaibandha Government Boys' High School
Gaibandha Government Girls' High School
Palashbari S.M. Pilot High School
Madrasa
Nutan Bandar Girls Dakhil Madrasha
 Mahimaganj Alia Kamil Madrasha
 Niamatnagar N U Shah Senior Madrasa, Sadullapur

Members of Jatiyo Sangsad

See also
Districts of Bangladesh
Rangpur Division

Notes

References

 
Districts of Bangladesh